The American Federation of School Administrators (AFSA) represents public school principals, vice principals, administrators, and supervisors in the United States. The trade union is affiliated with the AFL–CIO.

The union was established by the Council of Supervisory Associations, a local union representing principals and other supervisors in the New York City Department of Education.  Rather than becoming a directly affiliated local union, the AFL–CIO chartered the organization as the School Administrators and Supervisors Organizing Committee.

Because the Taft–Hartley Act does not recognize supervisors as union-eligible under federal law, AFSA only negotiates collective bargaining agreements in states where local labor rules permit them.  In most areas, the organization functions as a professional association rather than a traditional union.  A majority of the union's membership remains in New York City, however.

The organization publishes The School Leader and presents the Distinguished Leadership Award to highlight member achievements.

Composition

According to AFSA's Department of Labor records, about 36%, or more than a third, of the union's total membership are considered retirees, with eligibility to vote in the union. This accounts for 6,828 retirees, compared to 12,043 regular members.

See also
 American Association of School Administrators
 Association of Headteachers and Deputes in Scotland
 American Federation of Teachers

References

External links
 

AFL–CIO
Professional associations based in the United States
Educational organizations based in the United States
Education trade unions
Trade unions established in 1976
Trade unions in the United States
1976 establishments in the United States